Knight House may refer to:

in the United States (by state then town)
Ed Knight House, Pine Grove, Arkansas, listed on the National Register of Historic Places (NRHP) in Dallas County
Knight-Wood House, Littleton, Colorado, listed on the NRHP in Arapahoe County
William and Ruth Knight Lustron House, Atlanta, Georgia, listed on the NRHP in Fulton County
Frobel-Knight-Borders House, Marietta, Georgia, listed on the NRHP in Cobb County 
Knight-Stout House, Finchville, Kentucky, listed on the NRHP in Shelby County
Grant Knight House, Nicholasville, Kentucky, listed on the NRHP in Jessamine County
J. B. Knight House, Hopkinsville, Kentucky, listed on the NRHP in Christian County
Knight Cabin, Franklinton, Louisiana, listed on the NRHP in Washington Parish
Knight-Corey House, Boothbay, Maine, listed on the NRHP in Lincoln County
R. A. Knight-Eugene Lacount House, Somerville, Massachusetts, listed on the NRHP in Middlesex County
Morris A. Knight House, Flint, Michigan, listed on the NRHP in Genesee County
William Baker and Mary Knight House, Kansas City, Missouri, listed on the NRHP in Jackson County 
Knights-Morey House, Goshen, New Hampshire, listed on the NRHP in Sullivan County
 Collings-Knight Homestead, Collingswood, New Jersey, listed on the NRHP in Camden County
Douglas M. and Grace Knight House, Durham, North Carolina
Henry H. and Bettie S. Knight Farm, Knightdale, North Carolina, listed on the NRHP in Wake County 
Miller-Knight House, Miller, Ohio, listed on the NRHP in Lawrence County
William Knight House, Canby, Oregon, listed on the NRHP in Clackamas County
Knight Estate, Warwick, Rhode Island, listed on the NRHP in Kent County
Webb S. Knight House, Spearfish, South Dakota, listed on the NRHP in Lawrence County 
Knight-Moran House, Franklin, Tennessee, listed on the NRHP in Williamson County
Knight-Finch House, Orem, Utah, listed on the NRHP in Utah County
Jesse Knight House, Provo, Utah, listed on the NRHP in Utah County
Knight-Allen House, Provo, Utah, listed on the NRHP in Utah County
Knight-Mangum House, Provo, Utah, listed on the NRHP in Utah County
Hoag Gristmill and Knight House Complex, Starksboro, Vermont, listed on the NRHP in Addison County
Godwin-Knight House, Chuckatuck, Virginia, listed on the NRHP in Suffolk
Knight House (Spokane, Washington), listed on the National Register of Historic Places in Spokane County

See also
Knight Building (disambiguation)